Ghansali Legislative Assembly constituency is one of the 70 assembly constituencies of  Uttarakhand a northern state of India. Ghansali is part of Tehri Garhwal Lok Sabha constituency.

Members of Legislative Assembly
 2002 - Balveer Singh Negi (NCP)
 2007 - Balveer Singh Negi (INC)
 2012 - Bhim Lal Arya (BJP)
 2017 - Shakti Lal Shah (BJP)
 2022 - Shakti Lal Shah (BJP)

Election results

2022

See also
 Tehri Garhwal (Lok Sabha constituency)

References

External links
  
 
 RESULTS 2012 Uttarakhand State
 Purola (Uttarakhand) Elections 2022 Results

2002 establishments in Uttarakhand
Assembly constituencies of Uttarakhand
Constituencies established in 2002
Uttarkashi